The Slocum Massacre occurred on July 29–30, 1910, in Slocum, Texas, an unincorporated community in Anderson County near Palestine in East Texas. Only six deaths were officially confirmed, but some 22 were reported by major newspapers. This is the official count, and it is estimated as many as one hundred African Americans were killed.

Historians have offered several explanations for the sparking of the riot and massacre by whites. At the time, rumors placed responsibility on the blacks, saying that whites had armed in response to accounts of blacks planning a race war. The whites from the mob did their best to destroy any local evidence against them. African Americans appealed to higher levels of government for a fair investigation, but little to nothing was done on their behalf. As a result, the African-American population in Slocum declined drastically, as many left in fear of their lives.

Background 
Long before the Slocum Massacre occurred, racial tensions had been part of the state's history. In East Texas, where the majority of blacks had lived since before the American Civil War, enslaved African Americans had been brought by planters and traders to develop and work cotton plantations. Several counties had enslaved black majorities. In the aftermath of the war, whites resented the emancipation and enfranchisement of former slaves. In the post-Reconstruction era, conservative white Democrats regained control of county and state governments, and passed laws at the turn of the century to disenfranchise African Americans.

By the turn of the century, there had already been at least 335 lynchings, of which 261 victims were black. Most of these lynchings were based on allegations of whites against blacks. Even though the justice system discriminated against African Americans, most lynching victims never received a trial. A number of lynchings of African Americans in Texas had taken place in the time before the Slocum Massacre.

African Americans had struggled to gain social equality, as well as economic equality. They were frequently assigned only old, overworked plots for growing crops as tenant farmers of sharecroppers. They kept their farming land to smaller sizes to avoid troubles with jealous whites. The combination of unfruitful land and small farms made blacks more susceptible to falling into debt when they didn't have a good harvest season. Given the turmoil between races, black people felt threatened if they tried to advance economically.

Massacre 
The Slocum Massacre was originally said to have been sparked by two separate events. First, there was an  argument over a promissory note between Marsh Holley, a black businessman, and Reddin Alford, a disabled white farmer. Holley had not thought it was a serious argument. But whites heard that Holley was trying to cheat a disabled farmer, or Alford had lied and said that Holley was threatening him.

Secondly, black farmer Abe Wilson was sent to inform people of road maintenance in the area. A white farmer, Jim Spurger, got upset because he thought it was a violation of white supremacy to have a black man helping the community. Again, rumors distorted events. Wilson was rumored to be supervising a white road crew, which upset whites. Some time after the massacre, some people wondered if Spurger was worried about African Americans flirting with his daughters.

Another reported cause of the Slocum Massacre was the defeat of James J. Jeffries, a white boxer, by Jack Johnson, a black boxer, in what was billed as the "Fight of the Century". Resentful whites caused more than one race riot in 1910 after Jeffries's defeat.

Though these stories most likely contributed to the Slocum Massacre, locally white people in Anderson County believed rumors that a black uprising was being planned in retaliation for the recent lynching of a black man in the area. Whites put out a call to white men from nearby counties to come to their aid. As a precaution, the whites hid their women and children in schools and churches before setting out to hunt down blacks. White men stocked up on guns and ammunition, and drank alcohol. District Judge Benjamin Howard Gardner realized that the combination of alcohol, guns, and rumors about black uprisings could create a dangerous and potentially deadly outcome. Before the bloodshed began, he tried to counteract it by imposing a court order that closed all saloons, gun stores, and hardware stores, but he was too late. White men involved in the massacre had already obtained their weapons.

The violence began on July 29, when six white men confronted a group of black teenagers. Most of the teenagers escaped, but one was murdered by the mob. Soon after, mobs of up to 50 white men were formed throughout Anderson County; these groups raided black neighborhoods and attempted to kill any black person they encountered. Some mobs shot African Americans as they tried to flee through the forest. The Slocum Massacre lasted through the night, for a total of 16 hours. Though only five casualties were confirmed, the casualty amount was likely much higher.

Sheriff William H. Black said that "Men were going about killing Negroes as fast as they could find them, and, so far as I was able to ascertain, without any real cause". He also described it as “There was just a hot-headed gang hunting them down and killing them.…They were just hunting the negroes down like sheep."

After the bloodshed ended, Sheriff Black and Sheriff Lacy from the surrounding area arrived in Anderson County to address and investigate the killings of African Americans. When they arrived, they said everyone was afraid, and all white males were armed. Sheriff Black and Godfrey Rees Fowler went to the scene to complete a thorough investigation of the events. Sheriff  Black ruled that whites did not have a legitimate reason to kill, since whites attacked even when the blacks did not.

Deputy Sheriff Stubblefield was also called to the scene. Whites in Anderson County warned him of a threat of assassination by an African American. This shows that whites were still fearful and willing to kill. Because of the fear in both the white and black population, governor Thomas Mitchell Campbell ordered Texas Rangers and the State Militia to Anderson County. The Texas Rangers began their work by helping black women and children. On their search, black neighborhoods were empty. Blacks' property was frequently stolen. Deaths of an elderly couple was unrelated. The rangers confirmed that black people believed that white people were hunting them.

Even with the rumor of a black uprising against whites proven false, Marsh Holley, a witness to murders and one of the reasons that the Slocum Massacre began in the first place, was put in jail as protection. He denied that the promissory note was the cause of the massacre.

It was said that the burial site of African Americans was on Abe Wilson's land. Some say that there were six deaths total, and the deceased were wrapped in blankets, put in pine boxes, and buried in a trench. Others say that bodies were thrown in the ditch. Others reported seeing bodies abandoned in woods, fields and canebrakes. The final death toll was never determined. But by the 1920 census, at least one-half of the black population had left Slocum.

Black resident Jack Holley survived the massacre; he fled the area with his family. He left the granary, dairy, and general store that he had built up as a freedman. Other Holley family survivors included Wilustus "Lusk" Holley, who witnessed his brother, Alex, being murdered. He escaped by playing dead and soon moved to Fort Worth. Reagan and Marshall Holley stayed in Anderson County for the rest of their lives. Besides the Holleys, seven other men who died in the massacre were Cleveland "Cleve" Larkin, Sam Baker, Dick and Jeff Wilson, Ben Dancer, John Hays and Will Burly.

Reactions 
Newspapers including Palestine Daily Herald, Fort Worth Star-Telegram, Greensville Morning Herald, Fort Worth Record, The Galveston Daily, New-York Tribune, and Abilene Daily News all mentioned that conflict in Anderson County was started by African Americans or race riots which put partial blame on African Americans. This caused violence towards African Americans to increase significantly. However, The Palestine Daily Herald told some parts of the truth about how white people thought that African Americans were plotting against them. The title of the article in The New York Times was "Score of Negroes Killed by Whites" and discussed the wrongful killings of African Americans and the poor reasons behind the massacre.

Twenty years after the massacre, a man named Hayes owned land in Slocum that the town needed. In exchange for the land, he requested that the city establish a historical marker to remember those who were killed. His request was denied. The town said it no longer needed the land.

Despite efforts by African Americans to draw attention to the massacre, the federal government remained largely uninterested in investigating the murders or bringing criminal prosecutions. John A. Siddon, a Volga postmaster, sent a letter to Cecil A. Lyons, chairman of the Texas Republican State Executive Committee in Sherman, asking for his help in securing a federal investigation. Lyons forwarded the letter to the United States Attorney General, George W. Wickersham. It is unknown whether Siddon even received a response.

A group of local black ministers also appealed for federal help in a letter to President Taft. They wanted a "Doctrine of Fairness" and suffrage granted to them by the government, with no loopholes and under the protection of the law. Taft sent this letter to Wickersham, and he responded to the ministers by saying that the federal government could not fulfill their requests or become involved because no constitutional rights were being violated in any of these instances. However, the federal government did become involved when a Mexican American was lynched in Texas.

21st century
In the early 21st century, the Slocum Massacre is considered by some to be forgotten, because it is not taught in Texas public schools. Some have even said that it didn't happen. In 2011, the 82nd Texas Legislature adopted Resolution 865, officially acknowledging that the massacre occurred. It stated the murders were unjust and wrongfully committed, but did not commit the legislature to conduct an investigation.

Suspects involved in the massacre 
During the early 1900s, indictments and prosecutions tended to side with white mobs when it came to crimes against African Americans. Anderson County District Court Judge Benjamin H. Gardner released a statement that said that law enforcement would start turning away and shooting to kill (if necessary) those who sympathized with the mobs or participated in them. He also said that he would no longer tolerate law enforcement officers who favored the mobs. Gardner called a grand jury to identify suspects in the case, and intended to prosecute men indicted as a result.

After investigations and arrests began, Texas Rangers arrested Josh Bishop, Isom Garner, and Walter Ferguson. Reeves arrested Jim Spurger, who was involved in one of the initial conflicts. G. W. Bailey, Morgan Henrey, Frank Bridge, Andrew Kirkwood, and B.J. Jenkins were arrested as well. Despite the investigations and arrests, law enforcement was unable to conclude how many people had died at the hands of the mobs.

Judge Gardner knew that whites would have the majority even if a crime was committed, so he asked the jurors to excuse themselves if it was impossible to complete a fair trial. On August 5, S.C. Jenkins was arrested, and Ferguson and Bishop were released. On August 14, Lusk Holley and Charlie Wilson were summoned as witnesses, and Curtis Spurger (Jim Spurger's brother) was arrested. On August 17, the murder charges were released. No indictments were made for the murders of Alex Holley or John H. Hay, or the attempted murders of Charlie Wilson and Lusk Holley.

Of the indictments, two cases moved forward, but they did not make it to court. By the time the cases were ready for trial, Judge Gardner had been replaced. The new judge released all suspects for $1,500 bail. Gardner still wanted these men behind bars. He knew they were dangerous because he encountered Jim Spurger and Kirkwood in public. Spurger hit him in the face, and Gardner had to pull a pistol on Kirkwood. His desire for justice was never fulfilled: both Spurger and Kirkwood remained free for the rest of their lives.

List of suspects

 Josh Bishop: Released
 Isom Garner: Four first-degree murder charges; released on $1,500 bail
 Walter Ferguson: Released
 Jim Spurger: Two first-degree murder charges; released for $1,500 bail
 G. W. Bailey: Released for $1,500 bail
 Morgan Henrey: Released for $1,500 bail
 Frank Bridge: Released for $1,500 bail
 Andrew Kirkwood: Three first-degree murder charges; released for $1,500 bail
 B. J. Jenkins: Four first-degree murder charges; released for $1,500 bail
 S. C. Jenkins: Three first-degree murder charges; released for $1,500 bail
 Curtis Spurger: Three first-degree murder charges; released for $1,500 bail
 Lusk Holley: Witness
 Charlie Wilson: Witness

Oral histories 
Historian E. R. Bills has collected oral histories of the massacre, among them accounts from Mable Willis and Annie Mae Killgo.

Mable Willis was a young girl at the time. She remembers her parents helping African Americans by opening their house as a place of refuge to those running from mobs.

Elvie Ewell, a black girl, said that her father, uncles, and cousins were outside at the beginning of the riot, and were warned that white men were forming mobs and killing any African Americans that they could. Her father escaped, and their family moved out of Anderson County.

Lastly, the Sadlers recalled the Barnett family, who were African American, coming to their farm to seek help. The men from the Sadler and Barnett families armed in an attempt to fight off the mob. The mob made its way to the Sadler farm and were warned that the best shot in town, "Deaf and Dumb Gus" was stationed in the barn with a gun on them (Gus had many health issues and disabilities but was known to both the Blacks and whites for being a great shot who rarely missed). The mob ultimately went elsewhere in the face of this threat. The Sadlers believed that the mob's retreat from their farm was the end of the Slocum Massacre.

Annie Mae Killgo, a young white woman, said that in the weeks leading up to the massacre, there were local rumors that a Black uprising would take place. A group of white men found a Black girl near a creek and dunked her head until she admitted that an uprising was being planned. She said African Americans were waiting until all the whites were in church to begin an attack. She said that, in an attempt to provoke the attack before it began, white men placed women and children in churches and schools. Killgo's father, Robert Duke Killgo, was assigned to protect the church. She said that he and the other white men guarding the church shot sixteen to eighteen Black people who approached the church. Afterward, Robert Killgo fled to Georgia to avoid being arrested as a suspect.

Historical marker
In August 2014, Constance Hollie-Jawaid, a Dallas Independent School District administrator whose great-grandfather, Jack Holley, was among the Slocum Massacre victims, enlisted historian Bills to help apply for a Texas state historical marker commemorating the Slocum Massacre. Members of the Anderson County Historical Commission opposed the application, claiming a lack of evidence and that there had not been a race riot. Hollie-Jawaid then applied directly to the Texas Historical Commission.

The commission approved the marker on January 29, 2015. The marker identifies, by name, several men who were killed in the riot.

Works about the Slocum massacre 
The most comprehensive treatment of the Slocum Massacre is the book The 1910 Slocum Massacre: An Act of Genocide in East Texas written by E. R. Bills and published in 2014. In 2020, Bills and Hollie-Jawaid co-authored Ghosts of Slocum an illustrated screenplay "as told by its victims."

The massacre and its backstory are also the subjects of unpublished essays: “Bad Saturday: Revisiting the 1910 Slocum Massacre,” by Norris White Jr., a Stephen F. Austin State University student; and “Racial Disorder in East Texas: The 1910 Slocum Incident" by Linda Sue Stuard, a University of Texas at Tyler student.

References 

1910 in Texas
Massacres in the United States
July 1910 events
Anderson County, Texas